Apple boxes are wooden boxes or crates of varying sizes with holes on each end used chiefly in film production. These boxes are specialized pieces of equipment belonging to the grip department, and should not be confused with simple crates, other boxes, or boxes for apples.

Uses
As one of the most ubiquitous and useful pieces of equipment on a film set, apple boxes are used for anything that needs to be propped up or supported temporarily.  They can be used to prop up furniture and light stands, for leveling camera dolly track, or to provide temporary seats, workbenches, or stepladders.

Often the need arises to make an actor appear taller, either because of their height, or to fit with the composition of a particular shot. In this use apple boxes are jokingly referred to as "man makers".

Apple boxes were originally used for storage. They would have a forward opening in the box and it could be used as a double storage device for small necessary things.

Sizes
Full apple (also referred to as just an "apple box") 20"×12"×8"
Half apple 20"×12"×4"
Quarter apple 20"×12"×2"
Pancake (eighth apple) 20"×12"×1"

Nesting apple boxes fit the three smaller sizes into the full apple (which does not have the standard midway internal support crossbeam). To accommodate the smaller internal dimensions, the half, quarter and pancake are only 18 1/2" long × 10" wide.

Half length "mini" apple boxes are now manufactured.

Mini apple box 10"×12"×8"
Mini half 10"×12"×4"
Mini quarter 10"×12"×2"
Mini pancake/eighth 10"×12"×1"

Apple box sizes vary somewhat depending on manufacturer, but all sizes are designed to be fractions of the "full apple" size. Thus two half apples exactly equal the size of a full apple, two quarters equals one half, and two pancakes equal one quarter. This modular design is often critically important as many applications require mixes of sizes.

Position
Often when a grip is placing an apple box others are lifting something heavy to put on top of it, thus arose the need for terms describing what position the apple box should be placed in (i.e., which side of the apple box should be placed face-down). It is rare that these terms are used for anything other than the "full apple" size.

New York or "A": Positioned so the apple box is tallest, like the tall buildings in New York, 20" high.
Texas/Chicago or "B": Positioned so the apple box is resting on its longest narrow side, 12" high.
LA or "C": Positioned so the apple box is flattest, 8" high.

Regional variations exist for the colloquial names of these positions.  These include  1/2/3, New York/Chicago/LA, and Manhattan/Brooklyn/Queens.

Basso blocks
Basso blocks are a stacking variant of conventional apple boxes.  Their design gives the same elevation ability of Apples, but takes 66% less storage space. A full set of Basso Blocks is equivalent to twelve 1/2 Apples. A set of 1/2 Basso Blocks is equivalent to twenty-four 1/4 Apples.

Elephant blocks are a three legged stable update to Basso Blocks that allow 1" elevation increments.

See also
 Motion picture terminology

References

Film production